Massey Branch is a  long 1st order tributary to Green Spring Branch in New Castle County, Delaware.

Course
Massey Branch rises in a pond on the Blackbird Creek divide about 0.5 miles northeast of Prices Corners, Delaware.

Watershed
Massey Branch drains  of area, receives about 44.3 in/year of precipitation, has a topographic wetness index of 605.20 and is about 1.4% forested.

See also
List of rivers of Delaware

References 

Rivers of Delaware
Rivers of New Castle County, Delaware
Tributaries of the Smyrna River